Salerno (foaled 1965 in Kentucky) was an American Thoroughbred racehorse who compiled a record of 8-3-8 in 33 career starts and retired in 1969 with earnings of $103,149. He was owned by Alice and James P. Mills and trained by William H. Turner, Jr. who went on to train the 1977 U.S. Triple Crown winner,  Seattle Slew.

A grandson of Ribot, among Salerno's most important successes came as a two-year-old when he won the 1967 Remsen Stakes. The following year, he had a second-place finish in the Withers Stakes.

Salerno was retired to his owner's Hickory Tree Farm in Middleburg, Virginia.

References
 Salerno's pedigree and partial racing stats

1965 racehorse births
Racehorses bred in Kentucky
Thoroughbred family 13-c
Racehorses trained in the United States
Du Pont racehorses